Yamana is a rural locality (a settlement) in Verkhnekalinovsky Selsoviet, Kamyzyaksky District, Astrakhan Oblast, Russia. The population was 14 as of 2010. There are 2 streets.

Geography 
Yamana is located 24 km south of Kamyzyak (the district's administrative centre) by road. Nizhnekalinovsky is the nearest rural locality.

References 

Rural localities in Kamyzyaksky District